Interstate 84 (I-84) is an Interstate Highway in the northwestern United States. The highway runs from Portland, Oregon, to a junction with I-80 near Echo, Utah. The highway serves and connects Portland, Boise, and Ogden, Utah. With connections to other highways, I-84 connects these cities to points east and also serves as part of a corridor between Seattle and Salt Lake City. The sections running through Oregon and Idaho are also known as the Vietnam Veterans Memorial Highway.

The highway originally served as a fork of I-80 to serve the Pacific Northwest, and was originally numbered Interstate 80N. It was generally built along the corridor of U.S. Route 30 (US 30) and US 30S, which themselves largely followed the Oregon Trail; the US 30S designation was decommissioned in the 1970s after the freeway replacement was mostly complete. The highway was signed with the I-84 designation in 1980, when a 1977 change in guidelines took effect that discouraged highway numbers with directional suffixes. The renumbering resulted in two highways being numbered I-84, with the other located in the Northeastern United States.

Route description 

|-
|
|
|-
|
|
|-
|
|
|-
|Total
|
|}

Oregon 

In the Portland metropolitan area, I-84 is sometimes referred to as the "Banfield Freeway" or simply "the Banfield", although the official name is the Banfield Expressway. This freeway is named after Thomas H. "Harry" Banfield (1885–1950), the chairman of the Oregon Transportation Commission from 1943 to 1950. As I-84 heads east, it also follows US 30 in a majority of I-84 from Portland, Oregon, to near Rupert, Idaho, with splits being variant in Oregon and Idaho, but before leaving Portland, there is a junction with I-205, along with cities Gresham, Fairview, Wood Village and Troutdale .

It also passes through Biggs Junction, Arlington, and Boardman outside of the Scenic Area before heading southeast to the junction with southern end of I-82 immediately southeast of the Umatilla Chemical Depot near Hermiston. From the junction it continues southeast on to Pendleton.

East of Pendleton, I-84 climbs Emigrant Hill, a 6% grade, into the Blue Mountains. The westbound lanes switchback twice on its descent into Pendleton. Eastbound lanes feature the tightest curves allowed on the Interstate Highway system, even though those curves are on the uphill (eastbound) direction.

It passes by North Powder and Baker City and through the Burnt River canyon. Around Huntington, it crosses into the Mountain Time Zone then briefly follows the southwest bank of the Snake River (Brownlee Reservoir), then continues to Ontario before crossing the Snake River into Idaho.

Idaho 

I-84 enters Idaho by crossing the Snake River at Ontario, Oregon. From there, it continues on to the major cities of the Treasure Valley (or Boise metropolitan area) including Caldwell, Nampa, Meridian, and Boise (where I-184 connects travelers to downtown). From Boise, I-84 continues southeast passing near several small cities (Mountain Home, Glenns Ferry, and Jerome) on its way to Twin Falls.

Just east of Jerome, I-84 passes within  of Twin Falls, but does not cross the Snake River Canyon or into Twin Falls County. Access to Twin Falls is afforded by an intersection with US 93 at Exit 173; US 93 southbound crosses the Snake River via the Perrine Bridge.

After Twin Falls, I-84 continues through Burley and Heyburn. While I-86, along with US 30 heads east, then northeast to American Falls and Pocatello (following the Oregon Trail), I-84 heads southeast to the border with Utah.

Utah 

From Idaho, I-84 enters Utah at a point approximately 7 miles (11.3 km) from Snowville in Box Elder County. It proceeds southeast through Rattle Snake Pass towards Brigham City where I-84 joins I-15 (just west of Tremonton) for its next .

Just north of Brigham City, at Corinne, Utah, I-84 joins the route of the First transcontinental railroad which the highway follows to its terminus. I-15/I-84 heads south to the cities of the Wasatch Front (Or the Ogden-Clearfield Utah Metropolitan part) passing through several smaller communities and then the west side of Ogden before I-84 separates towards Cheyenne, Wyoming, while I-15 heads to Salt Lake City, I-84 follows the Weber River east.

As the freeway gradually ascends through Weber Canyon it also passes through several small farming communities, including Morgan, where the Browning Arms Company headquarters can be seen from the freeway. Also visible in the canyon is Devil's Slide, an unusual rock formation just off the freeway. Farther up the canyon is the Thousand Mile Tree, planted by Union Pacific Railroad workers to mark  from the railroad's origin in Omaha, Nebraska.

The freeway ends at Echo, a near ghost town that before served as a stopover for the railroad, at a junction with Interstate 80, to Cheyenne, Wyoming, and US 189, to Jackson, Wyoming. Also near the junction are Echo Reservoir and Echo Dam.

The Utah sections of I-84 that are not concurrent with Interstate 15 are defined at Utah Code Annotated § 72-4-114(4).

History 

The Portland to Utah corridor was proposed as one of the national "toll superhighways" in a 1939 report by the Bureau of Public Roads. It was formally included in the Interstate Highway System, created in 1956, and was originally proposed to be numbered as Interstate 82; however, it was never signed with this designation, and the Interstate 82 designation was later assigned to a different road that connects Ellensburg, Washington, to Yakima, Washington, the Tri-Cities region, and Hermiston, Oregon. The freeway was assigned the designation of I-80N in the 1958 plan, in part to correspond with US 30. The Portland segment of then-I-80N was proposed to run on the Mount Hood Freeway and a section of I-205. Plans for this were officially dropped in 1974 after a successful freeway revolt.

The American Association of State Highway and Transportation Officials established guidelines recommending that "suffixed" highways, such as I-80N, be renumbered. In 1977, Idaho officials recommended that I-80N be renumbered to I-84. The motion was seconded by officials in Utah (who initially proposed this as I-82), but opposed by Oregon and Washington. The motion passed on July 7, 1977, and the states were given until July 1, 1980, to implement a coordinated renumbering strategy. After renumbering, I-84 violated the Interstate Highway Numbering Convention by being south of the modern incarnation of I-82.

Major intersections 
Oregon
 in Portland
 in Portland
 near Hermiston
Idaho
 in Boise
 near Declo
Utah
 from Tremonton to Ogden
 in Echo

Auxiliary routes 
Boise, Idaho: I-184

See also 
Business routes of Interstate 84
Interstate 84 (Pennsylvania–Massachusetts)

References

External links 

Interstate 84
84 west
84 west